Mamadou Mbaye may refer to:

Mamadou "Jimi" Mbaye, Senegalese guitarist
Mamadou "Momo" Mbaye, Senegalese footballer